The Instituto Federal de Educação, Ciência e Tecnologia Baiano (IFBAIANO) is an institution that offers high and professional educations by having a pluricurricular form. It is an multicampi institution, especialized in offering professional and technological education in different areas of knowledge (biologics/human sciences/exact sciences).

The Instituto Federal de Educação, Ciência e Tecnologia Baiano is a federal institution, public, directly vinculated to the Ministry of Education of Brazil, and was created by the law 11.892 of 2008. The main campus is in Salvador.

References 
 
The information in this article is based on that in its Portuguese equivalent.

Universities and colleges in Bahia
Educational institutions established in 1910
Baiano
1910 establishments in Brazil